Los Cachorros (The Cubs) is a 1973 Mexican film drama directed by Jorge Fons and written by Fons, Eduardo Lujan,  José Emilio Pacheco based upon the novel The Cubs and Other Stories by Peruvian writer Mario Vargas Llosa.

Plot
It tells the story of a group of friends that stand by each other well into adulthood. The film starts innocently enough when young Cuellar (12-years-old) enters a new school. He immediately makes friends with 4-other youngsters. One day after soccer practice while taking a shower, a vicious dog is let loose and it severely mauls him devouring his genitals. He is as a result maimed for life and this novel  uses his development into adolescence and later into adulthood to explore the problems he faces. These are both sexual, obviously, but also his lack of hormones very much changes his relationships with his group of close friends and he finds it very hard to come to terms with the fact that they start to get girlfriends, and later, married. Italian title: Eviration - Bramosia Dei Sensi.

Awards

Ariel Awards
The Ariel Awards are awarded annually by the Mexican Academy of Film Arts and Sciences in Mexico. Los Cachorros received two nominations.

|-
|rowspan="2" scope="row"| 15th Ariel Awards
|scope="row"| Helena Rojo
|scope="row"| Best Actress
| 
|-
|scope="row"| Eduardo Luján, Joaquín Gutiérrez Heras
|rowspan="1" scope="row"| Best Original Score
| 
|-

References

External links

1973 films
1973 drama films
Films directed by Jorge Fons
1970s Spanish-language films
Mexican drama films
Films based on works by Mario Vargas Llosa
1970s Mexican films